Nathaniel Cantley (1847–1888) was a British botanist and expert in tropical horticulture, agriculture, and forestry.

Nathaniel Cantley worked at Kew Gardens and was then from 1872 to 1880 the assistant director of the Royal Botanic Gardens, Pamplemousses in Mauritius. In 1880 he was appointed superintendent of the Singapore Botanic Gardens, as successor to Henry James Murton.

In an official report, Cantley estimated that by 1883 about 93 percent of the Straits Settlements' original inland forest had been destroyed.

He became sick with fever in Singapore and went on a voyage to Australia with his wife. He died from his illness in Hobart, Tasmania. His successor as superintendent was Henry Nicholas Ridley.

Eponyms
 Lithocarpus cantleyanus
 Memecylon cantleyi

References

1847 births
1888 deaths
19th-century British botanists